Arthur William Hitchins (1 December 1913 – 10 October 1975) was an English professional footballer who played for Walthamstow Avenue, Lee Bridge Gasworks, Tottenham Hotspur, Northfleet United, Tottenham Hotspur.

Football career 
Hitchins began his career at Walthamstow Avenue before joining Tottenham Hotspur in 1934. Hitchins had a spell with Tottenham's nursery side Northfleet United  and returned to White Hart Lane in 1937. The centre half went on to feature in 42 matches and scored on one occasion for the "Lilywhites" in all competitions between 1937 and 1939.

References 

1913 births
1975 deaths
Sportspeople from Devonport, Plymouth
English footballers
Walthamstow Avenue F.C. players
English Football League players
Northfleet United F.C. players
Tottenham Hotspur F.C. players
Watford F.C. wartime guest players
Association football defenders